The 2024 European Figure Skating Championships is scheduled to be held in January 22–28, 2024, in Budapest, Hungary.

Qualification

Number of entries per discipline 
Based on the results of the 2023 European Championships, each European ISU member nations can field one to three entries per discipline. While it is uncertain whether Russia and Belarus, which were banned in competing in the championships, could get full entries as prior to the 2022 European Championships results.

References 

European Figure Skating Championships
European Figure Skating Championships
International figure skating competitions hosted by Hungary
Sports competitions in Hungary